Józef Holewiński (1848–1917) was a Polish graphic artist, engraver and painter.

Career
Holewiński was a leading representative of Polish wood engraving.
He did work for a number of periodicals, including Kłosy (Gleanings), Wędrowiec (The Wanderer) and Moderne Kunst (German: Modern Art). From 1891 he was artistic director at the Warsaw Tygodnik Ilustrowany (Illustrated Weekly).

He engraved paintings and drawings for periodicals after Jan Matejko, Juliusz Kossak and others. He executed reproductions for Album Jana Matejki (Album of Jan Matejko, 1876).

Toward the end of his life, Holewiński painted landscapes and portraits.

Gallery
Works by Holewiński:

See also
List of Poles

Notes

References
"Józef Holewiński," Encyklopedia Powszechna PWN (PWN Universal Encyclopedia), volume 2, Warsaw, Państwowe Wydawnictwo Naukowe, 1974.

1848 births
1917 deaths
19th-century engravers
20th-century engravers
Polish engravers
Polish draughtsmen
19th-century Polish painters
19th-century Polish male artists
20th-century Polish painters
20th-century Polish male artists
Polish male painters